The women's 400 metre individual medley event at the 2022 Commonwealth Games will be held on 29 July at the Sandwell Aquatics Centre.

Records
Prior to this competition, the existing world, Commonwealth and Games records were as follows:

Schedule
The schedule is as follows:

All times are British Summer Time (UTC+1)

Results

Heats

Final

References

Women's 0400 metre individual medley
Commonwealth Games
Common